XQT may refer to:

 The IATA location identifier for Lichfield Trent Valley railway station - Lichfield (UK)
 The ISO 639-3 language code for Qatabanian
 A file extension for Waffle executable files or SuperCalc macro sheets.